Thorsten Schriever (born 7 March 1976), is a German football referee. He lives in Dorum and works as an administrative employee.

He has been active as a referee since 2000.

External links
 Profile at dfb.de 
 Profile at weltfussball.de 

1976 births
Living people
German football referees